Arthur Divett Hayter, 1st Baron Haversham,  (9 August 1835 – 10 May 1917), known as Sir Arthur Hayter, Bt, from 1878 to 1906, was a British Liberal politician. He served as Financial Secretary to the War Office under William Gladstone from 1882 to 1885.

Background and education
Hayter was the only son of Sir William Hayter, 1st Baronet, by Anne Pulsford, eldest daughter of William Pulsford. He was educated at Eton and Brasenose College, Oxford, and later joined the Grenadier Guards.

Political career
Hayter sat as member of parliament for Wells from 1865 to 1868, for Bath from 1873 to 1885 and for Walsall from 1893 to 1895 and 1900 to 1906. After succeeding his father in the baronetcy in 1878, he served under William Ewart Gladstone as a Lord of the Treasury from 1880 to 1882 and as Financial Secretary to the War Office from 1882 to 1885. He chaired the public accounts committee from 1901 to 1905 and was sworn of the Privy Council in 1901. In January 1906 he was raised to the peerage as Baron Haversham, of Bracknell in the County of Berkshire.

Personal life
Lord Haversham married Henrietta Hope in 1866. They lived at South Hill Park at Easthampstead, now part of Bracknell in Berkshire. There were no children from the marriage and the baronetcy and barony became extinct on Lord Haversham's death 10 May 1917, aged 81.

References

External links 
 

1835 births
1917 deaths
Hayter, Arthur
Barons in the Peerage of the United Kingdom
Hayter, Arthur, 2nd Baronet
Grenadier Guards officers
People educated at Eton College
People from Bracknell
Hayter, Arthur, 2nd Baronet
UK MPs 1868–1874
UK MPs 1874–1880
UK MPs 1880–1885
UK MPs 1892–1895
UK MPs 1900–1906
Members of the Privy Council of the United Kingdom
Peers created by Edward VII